Emperor Yizong of Tang (December 28, 833 – August 15, 873), né Li Wen, later changed to Li Cui, was an emperor of the Tang dynasty of China.  He reigned from 859 to 873.  Yizong was the eldest son of Emperor Xuanzong. After Emperor Xuanzong's death in 859, Emperor Yizong was placed on the throne by the eunuch Wang Zongshi, who killed other eunuchs supporting another son of Emperor Xuanzong, Li Zi the Prince of Kui.

According to traditional historians, Emperor Yizong did not pay much attention to governmental affairs but instead chose to live in opulence, became an alcoholic and surrounded himself with women while his government levied heavy taxes on its citizens.  A deeply devout Buddhist, even more so than his father, he would hold grand Buddhist ceremonies throughout the year as well as ordering frequent musical performances in the palace. If the entertainment was to his liking, Yizong would not only reward the entertainers greatly but also bestow governmental ranks.  Emperor Yizong eventually exhausted the empire's treasury that had accumulated during his father's administration. Extreme hardships, including famines that forced people to resort to cannibalism, led to widespread agrarian rebellions late in his reign. Those rebellions would plague the reign of his son Emperor Xizong.

Background 
Li Wen was born around the new year 834, during the reign of his cousin Emperor Wenzong.  His father Li Yi was then the Prince of Guang, and Li Wen was born at Li Yi's mansion.  He was Li Yi's first son.  His mother was Li Yi's concubine Lady Chao.

As imperial prince 
In 846, after the death of Emperor Wenzong's brother and successor Emperor Wuzong, Li Yi, whose name was changed to Li Chen, became emperor (as Emperor Xuanzong).  He created five of his sons, including Li Wen, imperial princes, with Li Wen carrying the title of Prince of Yun.  Li Wen's mother Lady Chao was created the imperial consort rank of Meiren, which was only the 15th highest rank for imperial consorts (and there could be as many as nine Meiren at any single point).  She died sometime in the middle of Emperor Xuanzong's Dazhong era (847–860), and was posthumously created the higher rank of Zhaorong, the sixth highest rank for imperial consorts.

Li Wen was not favored by his father, whose favorite son was his younger brother Li Zi the Prince of Kui; as a result, Li Wen was sent out of the palace to live at the imperial princes' residence, known as the Sixteen Mansions, while Li Zi and four other princes lived in the palace.  Emperor Xuanzong also considered creating Li Zi crown prince, but hesitated because Li Wen, not Li Zi, was his oldest son, and therefore went throughout his entire reign without designating an heir.

Late in Emperor Xuanzong's reign, he came to favor certain alchemists who promised immortality, and he took pills that they made. It was said that as a result, he became paranoid and easily angered. By 859, as a side effect of those pills, he had a large ulcerous boil on his back, such that he was bedridden and could not meet with the chancellors or other officials. He entrusted Li Zi to three high-level eunuchs that he favored—the directors of palace communications (Shumishi) Wang Guizhang and Ma Gongru and the director of the southern court affairs (宣徽南院使, Xuanhui Nanyuanshi) Wang Jufang.  After Emperor Xuanzong died, Wang Guizhang, Ma, and Wang Jufang did not initially announce his death, and were set to send one of the eunuch commanders of the Shence Armies, Wang Zongshi, who was not on good terms with them, out of Chang'an to Huai'nan Circuit (淮南, headquartered in modern Yangzhou, Jiangsu) to serve as the eunuch monitor for Huai'nan. Wang Zongshi, however, reacted by intruding into the palace; finding that Emperor Xuanzong had already died, he arrested Wang Guizhang, Ma, and Wang Jufang for falsely issuing edicts, and then put them to death.  He welcomed Li Wen to the palace, and then issued an edict in Emperor Xuanzong's name creating Li Wen crown prince and changing his name to Li Cui.  The next day, Emperor Xuanzong's death was announced, and Li Cui became emperor (as Emperor Yizong).

Early reign 
Emperor Yizong honored his grandmother (Emperor Xuanzong's mother) Empress Dowager Zheng as grand empress dowager, while posthumously honoring his mother Consort Chao as empress dowager.  Meanwhile, long-time lead chancellor Linghu Tao was relieved of his chancellor position and replaced with the former chancellor Bai Minzhong, although Bai, when recalled to the capital Chang'an, fell and suffered an injury while he was climbing up the stairs at the imperial meeting hall, and therefore never actually assumed chancellor position before resigning in early 861.

Meanwhile, Emperor Yizong was immediately met with two military crises.  Tang and Nanzhao had gotten into a diplomatic row over the name of the Nanzhao king Qiulong—as it violated naming taboo for Emperor Yizong's ancestor Emperor Xuanzong (Li Longji).  Emperor Yizong thus refused to issue an edict formally bestowing Qiulong his kingly title.  Qiulong responded by changing his state's name to Dali and declaring himself emperor (thus positioning himself as an equal to Emperor Yizong) and by attacking a number of Tang outposts.  Meanwhile, the agrarian rebel Qiu Fu and his followers were overrunning Zhedong Circuit (浙東, headquartered in modern Shaoxing, Zhejiang).  Qiu's rebellion was suppressed by the imperial general Wang Shi in 860, but the Dali attacks would become more intense, and Dali briefly captured the important city Yong Prefecture (邕州, in modern Nanning, Guangxi) in 861 and then captured Jiao Prefecture (交州, in modern Hanoi, Vietnam) in 862, retaining it.  Despite these crises, Emperor Yizong was said to be spending much of his time in feast and games, ignoring the affairs of state, despite his officials' urging to attend to them, although he was sending generals to the Dali front (including Kang Chengxun and Gao Pian), without initial success.

Middle reign 
Over the course of 865–866, however, Gao Pian was able to defeat Dali forces and recapture Jiao Prefecture.  Meanwhile, though, the tense situation on the Dali border at Xichuan Circuit (西川, headquartered in modern Chengdu, Sichuan) led to a major misstep on the part of Emperor Yizong, as he was misled by the official Li Shiwang into carving out seven border prefectures out of Xichuan into a new Dingbian Circuit (定邊, headquartered at Xi Prefecture, in modern Chengdu) and commissioning Li Shiwang as its military governor despite the obvious impractical nature of Dingbian's territory—as Xi Prefecture was extremely close to Xichuan's capital Chengdu Municipality and unsuitable to serve as the capital for a circuit intended to concentrate on border defense.  The Dingbian debacle demoralized the officers at Xichuan, who went as far as secretly encouraging Dali to attack Dingbian to expose Li Shiwang.

Yet more disastrous, though, was a mutiny by soldiers for Xusi Circuit (徐泗, headquartered in modern Xuzhou, Jiangsu), who had been posted to Gui Prefecture (桂州, in modern Guilin, Guangxi) to defend against a potential Dali attack, with a promise that they would be allowed to return home after three years.  When the term was up in 868, however, the governor of Xusi Circuit, Cui Yanzeng, ordered that the term be extended one year, causing the Xusi soldiers to mutiny under the leadership of Pang Xun.  They headed northeast home, and when they reached Xusi's capital Xu Prefecture, they attacked and captured it.  After Pang's initial attempts to obtain an imperial commission was rebuffed, the mutineer army attacked the nearby regions, with the imperial forces unable to stop them.  Not until Kang Chengxun, with major assistance from the Shatuo chieftain Zhuye Chixin (who was bestowed the imperial surname of Li, as well as a new name of Guochang because of his contributions), was able to defeat Pang in 869 was the rebellion suppressed.  (Subsequently, though, Kang, due to the false accusations of the chancellor Lu Yan and the imperial scholar Wei Baoheng (the husband of Emperor Yizong's favorite daughter Princess Tongchang), was exiled.)

Late reign 

Meanwhile, late in 869, Li Shiwang provoked Dali by killing its emissary Yang Qiuqing.  Dali's emperor Qiulong thus launched a major attack on Dingbian, and neither Li nor his successor Dou Pang was able to repel it.  The Dali forces quickly arrived at Chengdu's vicinity and put Chengdu under siege.  Emperor Yizong commissioned Gao Pian as Xichuan's military governor, and Dali forces thereafter withdrew, but both Dingbian (which was then merged back into Xichuan) and Xichuan had been deeply wounded.

Princess Tongchang died in 870, and this caused a major display of Emperor Yizong's caprice at the capital Chang'an, as Emperor Yizong, in anger that the imperial physicians were not able to cure her, executed some 20 imperial physicians and had some 300 of their relatives imprisoned.  When the chancellor Liu Zhan and the mayor of Jingzhao Municipality (京兆, i.e., the Chang'an region) Wen Zhang tried to intercede, both were exiled; in response, Wen committed suicide.  Princess Tongchang was buried in a grand ceremony that demonstrated Emperor Yizong's wastefulness.  As described in the Zizhi Tongjian:

Despite Princess Tongchang's death, Emperor Yizong continued to remain close to Wei Baoheng, who became extremely powerful and corrupt late in Emperor Yizong's reign.  Emperor Yizong also reacted in anger whenever Consort Guo's family was accused of misconduct.

In 873, in a grand ceremony, Emperor Yizong welcomed what was claimed to be a relic (a finger bone) of Gautama Buddha to the palace, despite warnings by some that his grandfather Emperor Xianzong died shortly after also welcoming the same relic to the palace.  (Emperor Yizong responded to the warnings by stating, "As long as I can see it once while living, I do not have regrets about dying.")  The ceremony was said to bring out great offerings by the households of Chang'an.  Emperor Yizong himself walked toward the relic and bowed on the ground in tears.

Later in the year, Emperor Yizong became critically ill.  With his not having designated an heir, the eunuchs Liu Xingshen and Han Wenyue supported his 11-year-old son Li Yan the Prince of Pu as his heir.  Liu and Han had an edict issued in Emperor Yizong's name creating Li Yan crown prince.  Emperor Yizong died the next day, and Li Yan took the throne (as Emperor Xizong).

Chancellors during reign

Family
Consorts and Issue:
 Empress Hui'an, of the Wang clan (d. 866)
 Li Xuan, Xizong (862–888), fifth son
 Empress Gongxian, of the Wang clan (d. 867)
 Li Ye, Zhaozong (867–904), seventh son
 Noble Consort, of the Yang clan of Hongnong (貴妃 弘農楊氏, 833 – 17 May 865)
 Pure Consort, of the Guo clan
 Princess Weiwenyi (849–870)
 Married Wei Baoheng of Jingzhao (d. 873) in 869
 Virtuous Consort, of the Wang clan (844–870)
 Princess Changning
 Two sons
 Jieyu, of the Cui clan (婕妤 崔氏)
 Jieyu, of the Wang clan (婕妤 王氏)
 Lady, of the Lei clan
 Li Ting, Prince Liang (d. 878), second son
 Unknown
 Li Yi, Prince Wei (d. 879), first son
 Li Ji, Prince Shu, third son
 Li Kan, Prince Xian, fourth son
 Li Bao, Prince Ji, sixth son
 Li Yi, Crown Prince Gong'ai (d. 897), eighth son
 Princess Anhua
 Princess Pukang (861–866), third daughter
 Princess Changyuan
 Princess Jinhua
 Princess Renshou
 Princess Yongshou
 Princess Suining, 11th daughter

Ancestry

References

Sources 
 Old Book of Tang, vol. 19, part 1.
 New Book of Tang, vol. 9.
 Zizhi Tongjian, vols. 248, 249, 250, 251, 252.
 任士英 (2005) 正說唐朝二十一帝 Taipei (台北): 聯經. 

833 births
873 deaths
Tang dynasty emperors
Tang dynasty Buddhists
Chinese Buddhist monarchs
9th-century Chinese monarchs